Michael J. Yaremchuk is a Professor of surgery, Part-Time at Harvard  Medical School and Chief of Craniofacial Surgery at its affiliated  Massachusetts General Hospital.

Education
Yaremchuk received his B.A. degree from Yale College in 1972, and his M.D. from the Columbia College of Physicians and Surgeons in 1976. He completed his  surgical residency at Harvard Deaconess Hospital (1976-1982), and his plastic surgery residency at  Johns Hopkins Hospital (1982-85).

Notable works 
 "Acute and Definitive Management of Traumatic Osteocutaneous Defects of the Lower Extremity."  Yaremchuk, Michael J. M.D.; Brumback, Robert J. M.D.; Manson, Paul N. M.D.; Burgess, Andrew R. M.D.; Poka, Atila M.D.; Weiland, Andrew J. M.D. Plastic & Reconstructive Surgery: July 1987 - Volume 80 - Issue 1

References 

Year of birth missing (living people)
Living people
American plastic surgeons
Harvard Medical School faculty
Physicians of Massachusetts General Hospital
Yale College alumni
Columbia University Vagelos College of Physicians and Surgeons alumni
Johns Hopkins Hospital physicians
American people of Ukrainian descent